Foreign relations exist between Australia and Nauru.  Australia administered Nauru as a dependent territory from 1914 to 1968 and has remained one of Nauru's foremost economic and aid partners thereafter. Nauru has a High Commission in Canberra and a consulate-general in Brisbane. Australia is one of only two countries to have a High Commission in Nauru. Both countries are members of the Commonwealth of Nations.

History 

During World War I, Australia seized control of Nauru, a German territory. Britain, Australia and New Zealand were given a joint League of Nations Mandate over Nauru in 1920, but the island was administered by Australia. It was governed by Australia as a United Nations Trust Territory after World War II. In 1968, Nauru became an independent sovereign nation.

Bilateral relations since Nauru's independence

In 1989, Nauru appealed against Australia to the International Court of Justice, due to the environmental devastation inflicted by phosphate mining during the colonial period. In 1993, Australia offered Nauru an out-of-court settlement of 2.5 million Australian dollars annually for 20 years.

In 2001, bilateral relations were strengthened by an agreement known as the "Pacific Solution". Nauru agreed to host a detention centre for refugee applicants seeking asylum in Australia, in exchange for economic aid. This agreement came to an end in 2007, following the election of Kevin Rudd as Prime Minister of Australia, prompting Nauruan concerns about the future of the island's revenue. In 2008, talks began between Australia and Nauru regarding the future of the former's economic development aid to the latter. Nauruan Foreign and Finance Minister Dr Kieren Keke stated that his country did not want aid handouts. One possible solution currently being explored would be for Australia to assist Nauru in setting up a "boat repair industry" for regional fishing vessels. In July 2008, Australia pledged €17 million in aid for the following financial year, along with assistance for "a plan aimed at helping Nauru to survive without aid", according to ABC Radio Australia.

Economic relations

In 1972, the government of Nauru bought the land at a price of A$19 million which became Nauru House in Melbourne as an international investment. In 2004, the Nauruan Government was forced to sell Nauru House to pay off debts.

Australia remains one of Nauru's two main diplomatic and economic partners, along with the Republic of China (Taiwan).

References

 
Australia and the Commonwealth of Nations
Nauru
Bilateral relations of Nauru
Nauru and the Commonwealth of Nations
Relations of colonizer and former colony